The Russia Yachting Federation is recognised by the International Sailing Federation as the governing body for the sport of sailing in Russia.

In reaction to the 2022 Russian invasion of Ukraine, World Sailing banned all Russian and Belarusian athletes, teams, and officials from participating in any World Sailing sanctioned sailing events.

Notable sailors and yacht clubs
See :Category:Russian sailors

See :Category:Yacht clubs in Russia

External links
 Official website
 ISAF MNA Microsite

References 

Sailing
National members of World Sailing
Yachting associations
Sailing associations
1912 establishments in the Russian Empire
Sailing in Russia
Sports organizations established in 1912